Macrosatellites are the largest of the tandem DNA repeats. Each macrosatellite repeat typically is several kilobases in length, and the entire repeat array often spans hundreds of kilobases. Reduced number of repeats on chromosome 4 (D4Z4 repeats) causes euchromatization of local DNA and is the predominant cause of facioscapulohumeral muscular dystrophy (FSHD). Other macrosatellites are RS447, NBL2 and DXZ4, although RS447 is also commonly referred to as a "megasatellite."

See also
 Microsatellite
 Minisatellite
 Satellite DNA

References

Genetics
Repetitive DNA sequences